Aspen Mountain (often called by its former name of Ajax among locals) is a ski area in the western United States, located in Pitkin County, Colorado, just outside and above the city of Aspen.

Founded   in 1946 by Walter Paepcke, Aspen was the first ski area venture of the Aspen Skiing Company.  It is one of four adjacent ski areas operated by the company as part of the Aspen/Snowmass complex. At only , it is somewhat small compared to other ski areas, especially compared to the much larger nearby Snowmass ski area, and retains a unique cultural flavor that harkens to the earlier days of recreational skiing in the state. The ski area is located within the White River National Forest and is operated under a permit from the U.S. Forest Service.  It has three restaurants on the mountain; two are on top (one is a club that only allows members), and one is mid-mountain.

History and Description

Before 1946, the mountain had been the site of skiing using a crude boat lift and by the use of the jeep trails up the back side of the mountain on Midnight Mine Road. In 1941, Aspen's first national downhill and slalom championships were held March 8–9. Fritz Benedict visited Aspen for the first time, the father of the 10th Mountain Hut and Trail System.  The foundation of the ski area in 1946 was accomplished with the installation of the single-seat chairlift, Lift-1. When it began operations on December 14, 1946, it was the longest chairlift in the world.

Many of the first employees were veterans of the U.S. Army's 10th Mountain Division, which had trained in Colorado at Camp Hale north of Leadville, including Friedl Pfeifer of Austria and Pete Seibert. Before the war, Pfeifer had headed the ski school at Sun Valley and did the same at Aspen; Seibert was a member of the Aspen ski patrol who later founded Vail Mountain in 1962.  In its fourth season, Aspen hosted the 1950 World Championships, the first world championships held outside of Europe, and the first since 1939.

Lift-1 ran until 1972, when it was replaced by two double chairlifts, Shadow Mountain (commonly referred to as 1A) and Ruthie's. The area's lifts include 1 high-speed quad, one high-speed triple, two quads, and three doubles.

The gondola is one of two lifts, along with the Little Nell chairlift, which ascends from Gondola Plaza in the heart of downtown Aspen. The configuration allows visitors to ascend the mountain from the town center and ski down the Little Nell Run back into town. The mountainside contains hidden and open remains of the intense silver mining activity from the Colorado Silver Boom in the late 1880s and early 1890s. In January 2001, it was decided to end Aspen Mountain's long-time ban on snowboarding. However, as a courtesy to season-pass holders, the resort was not officially opened to snowboarders until April 1, 2001.

The mountain is considered moderate to difficult, with no "green" (beginner) runs. Its sister mountain, Aspen Highlands, also has no beginner terrain as of December 2017. Novice skiers must go to Snowmass or Buttermilk. Approximately 26% of the terrain is considered expert. The season on the mountain ranges from late November to early April. It is typically the last area, along with nearby Snowmass, in the resort complex to close for the winter.

The ski area has a unique "homespun" culture that dates from its early foundation as part of the Utopian social experiment in Aspen created by Walter Paepcke in the 1940s, retaining somewhat of a throwback culture in comparison to the other three areas of the complex. The culture is reflected in the numerous homemade memorials and tributes that dot the trees of mountains created in honor of famous personages such as John Denver and Hunter S. Thompson.

It is rumored that under the Bell Mountain lift on Aspen Mountain was the home of the first Panty tree of bras, panties, thongs, and Mardi Gras necklaces as early as the late 1950s.

Gorsuch Haus and Lift Lodge One
A small lodging, shopping, and residential development is under development near the ski lift at Aspen Mountain. The ski lift itself will be moved closer to town. Originally proposed by a group with Aspen creds, it narrowly passed a vote in Aspen. However, it was soon sold, at a substantial profit, to the OKO Group, an international real estate development company owned by Vladislav Doronin, a controversial transaction.

Terrain and Lifts
Trails: 76 
 North: 50%
 East: 23%
 West: 27%

Aspen Mountain has 8 lifts. 

 highlight indicates a secondary lift, meaning it only runs on weekends and holidays or as backup lifts if the gondola is down.

Spring skiing on Aspen Mountain

References

 Beidleman, Neal (2006) Aspen Ski and Snowboard Guide Wolverine Publishing 
 Skiing Heritage (1997) "Skiing Comes to Aspen" Volume 9 #2
 Shelton, Peter (1996) Aspen Skiing: The First Fifty Years Western Eye Press 
 Asmus, Brad (1993) The Local's Guide To Skiing Aspen 
 O'Rear (1966) The Aspen story NY: A. S. Barnes

External links

Buildings and structures in Pitkin County, Colorado
Ski areas and resorts in Colorado
Roaring Fork Valley
Aspen Skiing Company
Tourist attractions in Pitkin County, Colorado
White River National Forest